Victoria Municipality is a municipality located in the Mexican state of Tamaulipas. Its municipal seat is Ciudad Victoria.

Municipal presidents

References

External links
Gobierno Municipal de Victoria Official website

Municipalities of Tamaulipas